Michael Groo Massee (September 1, 1952 – October 20, 2016) was an American actor. Active on screen during a three decade career, he frequently portrayed villainous characters. His film roles include Funboy in the dark fantasy The Crow (1994), Newton in the horror anthology Tales from the Hood (1995), Andy in the neo-noir Lost Highway (1997), and the Gentleman in The Amazing Spider-Man (2012) and its 2014 sequel. Massee also voiced Bruce Banner in the first two entries of Marvel Animated Features in 2006. On television, he played Ira Gaines on the first season of the Fox action drama 24 (2001–2002), Isaiah Haden on the NBC fantasy mystery Revelations (2005), Dyson Frost on the ABC science fiction drama FlashForward (2009–2010), and sadistic serial killer "Dr." Charles Hoyt on the first two seasons of the TNT police procedural Rizzoli & Isles (2010–2013).

Early life
Michael Groo Massee was born in Kansas City, Missouri in 1952, the younger of two children born to Jack Groo Massee and his wife, Holly ( Hoover), of Prairie Village, Kansas. 

The family moved to Paris, France, where Massee grew up and, after high school, he came back to the United States settling in New York, where he graduated from Hunter College and studied acting at the Neighborhood Playhouse School of the Theatre.

Career
In 1993, Massee portrayed the character Funboy in the film The Crow, starring Brandon Lee. Massee was the actor who fired the shot that killed Lee by accident on the set in 1993, due to an improperly prepared prop gun. Traumatized by the event, he returned to New York and took a year off from acting, and never saw the film. In an interview in 2005, 12 years after the incident, Massee revealed that he still had nightmares about it, stating, "I don't think you ever get over something like that."

In 1995, Massee played the cop Newton in the film Tales from the Hood. He provided the voice for the villain Spellbinder in The Batman, as well as appearing on the television series 24 as the villain Ira Gaines. He provided the voice of Bruce Banner for the Ultimate Avengers animated film, as well as the sequel Ultimate Avengers 2. He appeared in the film Seven alongside Brad Pitt and Morgan Freeman. He appeared in David Lynch's Lost Highway as Andy. He played the physical manifestation of Management (a.k.a. Lucius Belyakovin) on HBO's Carnivàle. He guest-starred in The X-Files episode "The Field Where I Died". He also appeared in the 2005 NBC TV miniseries Revelations as the main antagonist. In 2006, he guest-starred in Criminal Minds as a serial killer on death row. He also guest-starred in the Law & Order: Criminal Intent episode "Reunion" as a rock star. He appeared in the American TV series FlashForward as villain Dyson Frost. He appeared as a hunter, Kubrick, on the series Supernatural in 2007.

Massee portrayed imprisoned serial killer "Dr." Charles Hoyt in the first two seasons of the TV series Rizzoli & Isles. He played Gustav Fiers (alias The Gentleman) in 2012's The Amazing Spider-Man and reprised the role in the 2014 sequel, The Amazing Spider-Man 2. In 2014, Massee, who spoke French, appeared in the French series Interventions.

Personal life
Massee married Ellen Sussdorf in 1997, with whom he had two children: Jack and Lily. The couple owned a clothing boutique in Los Angeles.

Death
Massee died of stomach cancer in Los Angeles on October 20, 2016 at the age of 64.

Filmography

Film

Television

Video games

References

External links

1952 births
2016 deaths
American male film actors
American male television actors
American male voice actors
Male actors from Kansas City, Missouri
Deaths from cancer in California
Deaths from stomach cancer
20th-century American actors
21st-century American actors